Golmaal (formerly Buddhuram Dhol Duniya Gol) is a Bengali film directed by Narayan Roy starring Mithun Chakraborty along with Roopa Ganguly and Victor Banerjee.

Plot 
In Golmaal, Mithun Chakraborty plays the role of a cop named Buddhuram Dhol who is expected to solve all cases that comes to him. Roopa Ganguly plays his love interest who later marries Kunal Padhi. She plays the role of the mother of Katha who runs away from her home.

Cast 
Mithun Chakraborty – Buddhuram Dhol
Ashfaq Abidi - CBI Officer Vikram
Roopa Ganguly
Victor Banerjee
Bhola Tamang
Kunal Padhi
 Prity Biswas

References 

Bengali-language Indian films
2010s Bengali-language films